The blackspotted smooth-hound (Mustelus punctulatus) is a houndshark of the family Triakidae found on the continental shelves of the subtropical eastern Atlantic from the Mediterranean to the Western Sahara, between latitudes 45 and 20°N, from the surface to a depth of 250 m. It can reach of a length of 1.5 m.

Parasites
As other sharks, the blackspotted smooth-hound harbours a number of parasites. Triloculotrema euzeti is a monocotylid monogenean parasite within the nasal tissues, which was described in 2016 from sharks caught off Tunisia.

References

 
 

blackspotted smooth-hound
Fish of the Mediterranean Sea
Marine fauna of North Africa
blackspotted smooth-hound